The Lady Blunt is a Stradivarius violin made in 1721 by the renowned Italian luthier Antonio Stradivari. It is named after one of its first known owners, Lady Anne Blunt, the British co-founder of the Crabbet Arabian Stud.

Ownership
The first owner of record was Jean Baptiste Vuillaume, an award-winning luthier, who found the violin in Spain in the 1860s. He sold the instrument to Lady Anne Blunt, the daughter of Ada Lovelace and granddaughter of Lord Byron. In the 1890s, W.E. Hill & Sons bought the violin from her and sold it to an important collector.

It was sold at auction by Sotheby's in 1971 for the then-record amount of £84,000 by Robert Lowe, (US$200,000) who owned the violin for nearly 30 years.

It was sold again at Sotheby's in London on 14 November 1985 for a record price of £820,000 to a private collector.

In 2008 it was sold to the Nippon Music Foundation for over US$10 million in a private transaction.

In the wake of the 2011 Tōhoku earthquake and tsunami, the Lady Blunt was put up for charitable sale, with proceeds going to the Nippon Foundation's relief fund. Tarisio Auctions handled the sale online, raising almost £10 million (US$15.9 million), more than four times the previous auction record for a Stradivarius, held by the Molitor when it sold for US$3.6 million in 2010.

Instrument
The Lady Blunt is one of the two best-preserved Stradivarius violins in existence. It has survived, like the Messiah Stradivarius of 1716, in near-original condition, since it has resided mostly in the hands of collectors and seen little use. It was built on the PG form, being a mature golden period violin. The violin also retains its original neck. It has been played very rarely; Yehudi Menuhin played it in 1971, when the instrument was up for sale. In 2011 it was described as "the best-preserved Stradivarius to be offered for sale in the past century."

See also	 
 List of Stradivarius instruments

References

1721 works
Stradivari violins
Stradivari instruments